Chiretolpis ochracea is a moth of the family Erebidae first described by Rothschild and Jordan in 1901. It is found in New Guinea.

References

Nudariina
Moths described in 1901
Moths of New Guinea